James or Jim Knight may refer to:

People

Born before 1900
James Knight (explorer) (c.1640–c.1720), English explorer and director of the Hudson's Bay Company in America
James Knight (actor) (1891–1948), British actor
James Knight (Australian politician) (c. 1826–1876), member of the Victorian Legislative Council
James Knight (coach) (1875–1969), American football coach active 1902–1904
James H. Knight (1892–1945), American pilot
James Knight (architect) (1867–1930), British architect
James Knight (golfer), Scottish amateur golfer

Born after 1900
James L. Knight (1909–1991), American newspaper publisher
James A. Knight (1918–1998), psychiatrist, theologian, and medical ethicist
Jim Knight (footballer) (1918–1943), Australian rules footballer
James W. Knight (1925–2005), American Presbyterian minister
James Knight (diplomat) (born 1948), current United States Ambassador to Chad
Jim Knight (born 1965), British politician

Places 
James L. Knight Center, concert hall in Miami, USA
John S. and James L. Knight Foundation, American non-profit foundation

See also 
Knight (surname)